The M1870 Belgian Comblain was a falling-block rifle invented by Hubert-Joseph Comblain of Liège, Belgium and produced in several variants known as the Belgian, Brazilian or Chilean Comblain.

W.W Greener wrote in Modern breechloaders: sporting and military in 1871:

Users

: M1882 Belgian Comblain
:Given by Peru during the War of the Pacific 
: M1873 Brazilian Comblain and Brazilian Comblain Carbine Model 92
: M1874 Chilean Comblain

References

External links
militaryrifles.com Keith Doyon, 1996-2007

Rifles of Belgium
Rifles of Brazil
Weapons of Chile
Falling-block rifles
Early rifles